Dudley Borough Police was a police force in the Borough of Dudley, then an exclave of Worcestershire, in England, from 1920–1966.

History 

From 1839 until 1920, Dudley was policed by the Dudley Division of the Worcestershire Constabulary. Unusually, while the Worcestershire Standing Joint Committee had control over the administration and discipline of Dudley's police, the Dudley's local  watch committee was responsible for financial matters and recruitment. This caused many tensions. As a consequence, Dudley Borough Police was created, with effect from 1 April 1920.

Following the recommendations of the 1960 Royal Commission on the Police, the force was merged, with Walsall Borough Police and Wolverhampton Borough Police, and parts of the Staffordshire Constabulary and Worcestershire Constabulary, into the West Midlands Constabulary from 1 April 1966. Since a further merger in 1974, Dudley has been served by the West Midlands Police.

Chief constables

References 

Defunct police forces of England
1920 establishments in England
1966 disestablishments in England
Metropolitan Borough of Dudley
History of Worcestershire
Antecedents of the West Midlands Police